Variations on a Theme of Corelli (Variatsii na temu A. Korelli), Op. 42, is a set of variations for solo piano, written in 1931 by the Russian composer Sergei Rachmaninoff. He composed the variations at his holiday home in Switzerland.

The theme is La Folia, which was not in fact composed by Arcangelo Corelli, but was used by him in 1700 as the basis for 23 variations in his Sonata for violin and continuo (violone and/or harpsichord) in D minor, Op. 5, No. 12. La Folia was popularly used as the basis for variations in Baroque music. Franz Liszt used the same theme in his Rhapsodie espagnole S. 254 (1863).

Rachmaninoff dedicated the work to his friend, the violinist Fritz Kreisler. He wrote to another friend, the composer Nikolai Medtner, on 21 December 1931: 
 I've played the Variations about fifteen times, but of these fifteen performances only one was good. The others were sloppy. I can't play my own compositions! And it's so boring! Not once have I played these all in continuity. I was guided by the coughing of the audience. Whenever the coughing would increase, I would skip the next variation. Whenever there was no coughing, I would play them in proper order. In one concert, I don't remember where - some small town - the coughing was so violent that I played only ten variations (out of 20). My best record was set in New York, where I played 18 variations. However, I hope that you will play all of them, and won't "cough".

Rachmaninoff recorded many of his own works, but this piece wasn't one of them.

Structure
The Theme is followed by 20 variations, an Intermezzo between variations 13 and 14, and a Coda to finish. All variations are in D minor except where noted.

Theme. Andante
Variation 1. Poco piu mosso
Variation 2. L'istesso tempo
Variation 3. Tempo di Minuetto
Variation 4. Andante
Variation 5. Allegro (ma non tanto)
Variation 6. L'istesso tempo
Variation 7. Vivace
Variation 8. Adagio misterioso
Variation 9. Un poco piu mosso
Variation 10. Allegro scherzando
Variation 11. Allegro vivace
Variation 12. L'istesso tempo
Variation 13. Agitato
Intermezzo
Variation 14. Andante (come prima) (D major)
Variation 15. L'istesso tempo (D major)
Variation 16. Allegro vivace
Variation 17. Meno mosso
Variation 18. Allegro con brio
Variation 19. Piu mosso. Agitato
Variation 20. Piu mosso
Coda. Andante

See also
 List of variations on a theme by another composer

References

External links 
 
  Piano.ru - Sheet music download
  Chubrik.ru - Audio download

Compositions for solo piano
Piano music by Sergei Rachmaninoff
1931 compositions
Corelli
Composer tributes (classical music)